The Devon Sinfonia was created in 1983 as the chamber branch of the Devon Symphony Orchestra (UK).

The Devon Symphony Orchestra was itself founded in 1977 as a registered charity, giving concerts in aid of numerous charities which included the Arthritis and Rheumatism Council (UK).

Over a number of years the Orchestra and Sinfonia gave many performances in Exeter Cathedral and other venues; these performances including the Mozart Requiem, the Mendelssohn Elijah, the Haydn Nelson Mass, the Vivaldi Gloria, the Fauré Requiem, and the Bach Brandenburg Concerto No. 4 performed for the Exeter Festival in 1985.

Culture in Devon
English classical music groups